Helensville was a New Zealand parliamentary electorate in the Auckland region, returning one Member of Parliament to the House of Representatives. The seat was won and held by John Key through his term as prime minister. Chris Penk of the National Party held the seat from the 2017 general election until its abolition in 2020, when it was replaced with the new Kaipara ki Mahurangi electorate.

Population centres
The 1977 electoral redistribution, initiated by Robert Muldoon's National Government, was the most overtly political since the Representation Commission had been established through an amendment to the Representation Act in 1886. As part of the 1976 census, a large number of people failed to fill in an electoral re-registration card, and census staff had not been given the authority to insist on the card being completed. This had little practical effect for people on the general roll, but it transferred Māori to the general roll if the card was not handed in. Together with a northward shift of New Zealand's population, this resulted in five new electorates having to be created in the upper part of the North Island. The electoral redistribution was very disruptive, with 22 electorates being abolished, and 27 (including Helensville) being newly created or re-established.

Helensville was re-established in time for the 2002 election in response to continued high population growth in and around Auckland. It was formed from the northern flank of the Waitakere electorate with the addition of areas from the Rodney electorate around its southern boundary.

Helensville covers an area of the rapidly growing northern Auckland urban fringe, drawing Helensville and Kumeu from the former Rodney District, moving south to take in Paremoremo, Greenhithe and Albany from the former North Shore City, and finally tacking west to include Whenuapai, Hobsonville and West Harbour from the former Waitakere City.

The boundaries of the electorate changed significantly in the 2019/20 boundary review. Its northern boundary moved northward to become the same as the boundary between the Northland and Auckland local government regions, taking in part of the  electorate and all that part of Rodney electorate north of Waiwera, which is, by area, most of Rodney. On the other hand, an area running from Dairy Flat south to Paremoremo moved into Rodney, which is renamed the  electorate. Helensville also gained the suburb of Westgate from the  electorate. It was initially proposed that the electorate would keep the name Helensville, but after public submissions it became the Kaipara ki Mahurangi electorate.

History

When the Helensville electorate was abolished in 1984, Jones stood in the West Auckland electorate in the  but was defeated by the Labour Party candidate, Jack Elder.

Newcomer John Key beat sitting Waitakere MP Brian Neeson to the National Party nomination and, in a tight year for his party, won the electorate by 1,705 votes in a split field when a disgruntled Neeson stood as an independent. At the same election, Dail Jones contested the electorate for New Zealand First. Helensville was partly rural and was wealthy beyond the national average, making it a safe National electorate, and Key was returned easily in 2005, 2008, 2011 and 2014 with large majorities. Key became National Party leader in 2006 and prime minister in 2008. In December 2016, he announced that he would retire from politics before the 2017 general election. He was replaced as Helensville MP by Chris Penk.

Members of Parliament
Key

List MPs
Members of Parliament elected from party lists in elections where that person also unsuccessfully contested the Helensville electorate. Unless otherwise stated, all MPs terms began and ended at general elections.

1 Jones entered Parliament in February 2008 following the resignation of Brian Donnelly
2 Garrett resigned in September 2010, and his list position was taken by Hilary Calvert
3 Clendon entered Parliament in October 2009 following the resignation of Sue Bradford

Election results

2017 election

2014 election

2011 election

Electorate (as at 11 November 2011): 46,983

2008 election

2005 election

2002 election

1981 election

1978 election

Table footnotes

Notes

References

External links
Electorate profile,  Parliamentary Library

Historical electorates of New Zealand
New Zealand electorates in the Auckland Region
1978 establishments in New Zealand
1984 disestablishments in New Zealand
2002 establishments in New Zealand